Methyltriphenylphosphonium bromide is the organophosphorus compound with the formula [(C6H5)3PCH3]Br. It is the bromide salt of a phosphonium cation.  It is a white salt that is soluble in polar organic solvents.

Synthesis and reactions
Methyltriphenylphosphonium bromide is produced by treating triphenylphosphine with methyl bromide:
Ph3P + CH3Br → Ph3PCH3Br

Methyltriphenylphosphonium bromide is the principal precursor to methylenetriphenylphosphorane, a useful methylenating reagent.  This conversion is achieved by treating methyltriphenylphosphonium bromide with strong base.
Ph3PCH3Br  +  BuLi  →  Ph3PCH2  +  LiBr  +  BuH

References

Quaternary phosphonium compounds
Bromides